Ulakhan-Kyuyol may refer to:

Ulakhan-Kyuyol, Churapchinsky District, Sakha Republic, a selo in Sylansky Rural Okrug, Churapchinsky District, Russia
Ulakhan-Kyuyol, Verkhoyansky District, Sakha Republic, a selo in Tabalakhsky Rural Okrug, Verkhoyansky District, Russia
Lake Ulakhan-Kyuyol, in Zhigansky District